Stuart Gordon Briese (May 6, 1946 – March 12, 2019) was a politician in Manitoba, Canada.  He was elected to the Legislative Assembly of Manitoba in the 2007 provincial election, for the electoral division of Ste. Rose.  Briese was a member of the Progressive Conservative Party.

Biography 
Briese served twenty years on the council for the Rural Municipality of Langford. He also was a director of the Association of Manitoba Municipalities, serving as president and vice-president as well, and served three years on the board for the Federation of Canadian Municipalities. In 2013, he was awarded the Queen Elizabeth II Diamond Jubilee Medal for outstanding contribution to municipal government in Manitoba.

Briese was reelected in the 2011 provincial election for the newly created electoral division of Agassiz. In June 2014, he announced that he would not run for reelection in the upcoming general election. He died on March 12, 2019, at the age of 72.

References

External links
Stu Briese political profile

Progressive Conservative Party of Manitoba MLAs
2019 deaths
1946 births
21st-century Canadian politicians